Edward Bertram Johnston (11 January 1880 – 6 September 1942), known as Bertie Johnston, was the  Western Australian Legislative Assembly member for Williams-Narrogin from 1911 to 1928, and a Senator from 1929 until 1942.  His resignation from the Australian Labor Party in 1915 made possible the defeat of John Scaddan's Labor government in Western Australia.

Early life
Johnston was born in Geraldton, Western Australia on 11 January 1880, the son of  Harry Johnston, Surveyor-General of Western Australia.  He was educated at High School (now Hale School) in Perth, and from 1895 to 1909 was employed as a clerk in the Lands and Surveys Department.  He later became a wheat and sheep farmer near Narrogin, and a substantial investor in hotels and real estate.

State politics
Johnston joined the Australian Labor Party, and on 3 October 1911 was elected to the Western Australian Legislative Assembly seat of Williams-Narrogin. In his first term he largely supported John Scaddan's Labor government, but after being re-elected in 1914 he became an outspoken backbench critic of the government, and voted against it on a number of occasions. Johnston was the only Labor member for a farming seat after 1914, and he was greatly angered by Scaddan's failure to honour a promise to lower the price of crown land.

Late in 1914, the Scaddan government faced a no-confidence vote over its handling of the Nevanas affair. Johnston and the government's other main backbench critics, Edward Heitmann and George Taylor, were convinced not to bring down the government by the promise of a leadership spill. They voted with the government, and the government won by a single vote. However, the caucus subsequently voted to confirm the existing ministry. In protest, Johnston resigned from the Labor party and from parliament on 18 December 1915. He then contested the resulting by-election as an independent, and won. This left the government with just 24 seats in a house of 50. Scaddan's minority government was permitted to continue for six months, but in July 1916 it was defeated.

Despite the defeat of the Labor party, a Labor member, Michael Troy, remained Speaker, thus giving Frank Wilson's government an extra vote. In February 1917, Labor moved a motion of censure against the government, and Johnston indicated his intention to move an amendment.  Under the assumption that Johnston would support the censure as amended, Troy resigned as Speaker in order to give the Labor party sufficient numbers to defeat the government. However at the last minute Wilson and the leader of the Country Party Francis Willmott persuaded their followers to accept Johnston's nomination as Speaker. Johnston became Speaker on 13 February 1917, and the government were then able to defeat the censure motion by a single vote.  Greatly angered by what they saw as a betrayal, the Labor members refused to accept Johnston's authority.  When during a heated argument Johnston commanded Labor member John Holman to leave the chamber, Holman refused and a policeman was called to eject him. A number of Labor members then physically prevented Holman's removal. Johnston was forced to suspend the sitting, and the following day he resigned as Speaker, to be replaced by former leader of the Country party James Gardiner.

Johnston won his seat as a Country Party candidate in the election of September 1917, and would hold it for the Country Party until 1928. From 1923 until 1928, he was Deputy Leader of the Country Party.

Federal politics
Johnston resigned his Legislative Assembly seat on 3 October 1928, and on 17 November was elected to the Australian Senate for the federal Country Party. He took up his seat in the Senate on 1 July 1929, and remained a senator until his death in 1942.

Personal life
On 18 February 1931, Johnston married Hildelith Olymphe King-Lethbridge.  He fathered three daughters, one of whom married David Wordsworth, a future member of the Western Australian Legislative Council. Johnston owned a number of hotels in the Perth metropolitan area (including the Captain Stirling Hotel), as well as significant investments in rural Western Australia.

On 6 September 1942, he drowned at Black Rock, Melbourne, Victoria.

References

1880 births
1942 deaths
Deaths by drowning in Australia
People educated at Hale School
National Party of Australia members of the Parliament of Western Australia
Members of the Western Australian Legislative Assembly
Members of the Australian Senate for Western Australia
Members of the Australian Senate
Speakers of the Western Australian Legislative Assembly
People from Geraldton
Australian Labor Party members of the Parliament of Western Australia
20th-century Australian politicians